Kamil Jankovský (born 10 March 1958) is a Czech politician, who served as Minister of Regional Development of the Czech Republic from July 2010 to July 2013. He was appointed to Petr Nečas's Cabinet in July 2010.

References

External links

1958 births
Living people
Politicians from Prague
Public Affairs (political party) politicians
Regional Development ministers of the Czech Republic
Czech Technical University in Prague alumni